Southend University Hospital is an NHS hospital located in Westcliff-on-Sea, Southend-on-Sea, Essex. It is managed by Mid and South Essex NHS Foundation Trust.

History
In 1887, to celebrate Queen Victoria's Golden Jubilee, a public fund was started with the aim of building a hospital, and the site for Southend's first hospital was bought for £350 (in Warrior Square, near to Southend High Street). Built at a cost of £1,287 4s 6d, Southend Victoria Hospital was opened in May 1888. By Christmas, with eight beds and two cots, it had treated 61 patients at an average weekly cost of 4s 6d (22.5p).

In order to allow expansion a new site was identified at Westcliff-on-Sea: building work on the new hospital, which was designed by Henry Percy Adams, began in 1930 and the new building was officially opened by the Rt. Hon Earl of Iveagh in 1932. In 1948, when the hospital joined the National Health Service, there were 24 consultants and 11 resident medical staff. The Tower Block was officially opened by Princess Anne in 1971.

In December 2013, chief executive Jacqueline Totterdell announced that the Trust was considering merging some functions with other local hospitals.

The trust was the only one in England not to follow the Agenda for Change conditions of service for its staff, but in January 2019 it decided to revert to the national contract.

In April 2021 the hospital's Cherry Tree Wing opened. The first and second floors of the wing were opened in June 2021.

Teaching 
The hospital serves as a teaching hospital for medical students from Barts and The London School of Medicine and Dentistry.

Transport
Local bus routes 7 and 8 operated by Arriva and 20, 21 and 25 operated by First, serve the hospital. The nearest railway stations are Westcliff and Southend Central on the London, Tilbury and Southend line and Prittlewell and Southend Victoria on the Southend branch of the Great Eastern Main Line.

References

External links 

 
 Inspection reports from the Care Quality Commission

Hospital buildings completed in 1887
Hospital buildings completed in 1932
Hospitals in Essex
Southend-on-Sea (town)
1888 establishments in England
Hospitals established in 1888
NHS hospitals in England
Buildings and structures in Southend-on-Sea